Csaba Kelemen (10 September 1955 – 26 October 2020) was a Hungarian actor, stage manager, and politician who died of COVID-19.

Career
He graduated from University of Theatre and Film Arts in Budapest in 1980. From 1980 until 1982 he was a member of Csokonai Theatre in Debrecen. From 1982 until 1989 he worked at Budapest Radnóti Theater and in that year, he went to work at Eger Géza Gárdonyi Theater, where he worked as an actor and a stage manager until his death.

He was most active as a theatrical actor, but he also starred in a few commercially successful television series in Hungary in the 80s and 90s, mainly in supporting roles.

He had played in 126 plays, and contributed to 78 theatrical premieres in 13 years.

As a politician
From 1994, he was Heves County Secretary-General and Eger President of the Independent Smallholders, Agrarian Workers and Civic Party.

Theater (selection)
Géza Gárdonyi: Eclipse of the Crescent Moon – István Dobó
Sándor Márai: Embers – Capt. Konrád
William Shakespeare: The Twelfth Night - Orsino
Edward Albee: Who's Afraid of Virginia Woolf? - George 
Samuel Beckett: Waiting for Godot – Pozzo
Eugene O'Neill: Long Day's Journey into Night – James Tyrone
Mikhail Bulgakov: The Master and Margarita - Stravinsky 
Jerry Bock: Fiddler on the Roof - Avram
Raymond Chandler: The Long Goodbye – Det. Dayton
Willy Russell: Blood Brothers – Mr. Lyons

Television (selection)
Szomszédok – Ferenc Dőri (ambulance officer) (1987-1992)
Angyalbőrben (1990)
Kisváros – Oszkár Erdős, business partner of Mr. Trócsányi (1994-1999)
Embers – Capt. Konrád (2010)
 Szinglik éjszakája – Tibor, Juli's father

Death
He died of COVID-19 on 26 October 2020, at Miskolc Hospital in Hungary.

References

1953 births
2020 deaths
People from Szolnok
Deaths from the COVID-19 pandemic in Hungary
Hungarian actors
Independent Smallholders, Agrarian Workers and Civic Party politicians